Celestine Echezona Anyichie (born 14 May 1990) is a Nigerian footballer who plays as a defender for George Telegraph in the Calcutta Football League.

Career

Finland

Eche had a trial in Finland for top tier Finnish club HJK Helsinki, but failed to earn a contract. He then signed for another Veikkausliiga side AC Oulu.

Nigeria

After the stint in Finland he returned to Nigeria to play for Dolphins F.C. in the Nigeria Premier League.

Thailand

He had a brief spell in Thailand Premier League for Samut Songkhram F.C.

India

Southern Samity signed Echezona for the 2012 I-League 2nd Division. Though his team failed to qualify his performance was appreciated, and thus Mohun Bagan AC signed him up on a 1-year contract for 2012–13 I-League. He has also played for Chennai City during the 2016–17 I-League Season.

International 

He has represented Nigeria in the 2003 FIFA U-17 World Championship. He started all the matches for his country in the group stages and played alongside the likes of Mikel John Obi and Chinedu Obasi.

References

External links
 
 youtube.com

Nigerian footballers
1990 births
Living people
I-League players
I-League 2nd Division players
Mohun Bagan AC players
Nigerian expatriate sportspeople in India
Expatriate footballers in India
Association football defenders
George Telegraph S.C. players
Calcutta Football League players